Pathein halawa is a traditional Burmese dessert or mont. The dessert is a pudding cooked using glutinous rice flour, rice flour, coconut, sugar, poppy seeds, butter, and milk, and has 2 primary variants: wet and dry. The dessert was first sold in Bassein (now Pathein), an Irrawaddy Delta town in the 1930s, and is now considered a delicacy of Pathein.

Pathein halawa is prepared in a similar manner as other Burmese desserts including mont kalame (မုန့်ကုလားမဲ) and htoe mont (ထိုးမုန့်).

References

Burmese cuisine
Desserts
Burmese desserts and snacks
Halva
Rice cakes